The Crescent is a street in Limerick, Ireland and is one of the highlights of Georgian Limerick.
The area takes its name from the shape of the terraced buildings on both sides. The two sides combined give the street a distinctive crescent oval shape. The Crescent was originally known as Richmond Place (after Charles Lennox, 4th Duke of Richmond).
A monument to Daniel O'Connell; the 19th Century Irish political leader stands at the centre of The Crescent overlooking O'Connell Street. On the west side is the Church of the Sacred Heart, a former Jesuit church that closed in 2006. In 2012 the church was bought by a new religious order known as the Institute of Christ the King Sovereign Priest who hope to restore the church. Adjoining the Church of the Sacred Heart was Crescent College run by the Jesuit Order. It is now located in Dooradoyle suburbs. The site is now occupied by Limerick Tutorial College, a fee paying private school.

Crescent College in turn lends its name to the Crescent Shopping Centre beside its new premises in Dooradoyle, and to Old Crescent rugby club, founded by former pupils.

References

Streets in Limerick (city)
Limerick (city)
Crescents (architecture)